Dipton is a village located in County Durham, England. It is situated to the north-east of Consett, 3 miles south west of Burnopfield and a short distance to the north-west of Annfield Plain.

The local village school is called Collierley Primary School.  Very little housing development occurred in the 1980s, but new housing estates have been built in the village over the last 10 years, which in turn have sustained a younger generation of villagers. The Parish Church was dedicated to St John the Evangelist, but is now closed and is in the process of being converted into a house.

It is close to the Pontop Pike Television Transmitter.

External links
UK Transmitters Pontop Pike
Church
Colliery
Local History

Villages in County Durham